Belliena is a genus of jumping spiders that was first described by Eugène Louis Simon in 1902.

Species
 it contains five species, found only in Ecuador, Venezuela, and on Trinidad:
Belliena biocellosa Simon, 1902 (type) – Venezuela
Belliena ecuadorica Zhang & Maddison, 2012 – Ecuador
Belliena flavimana Simon, 1902 – Venezuela
Belliena phalerata Simon, 1902 – Venezuela
Belliena scotti Hogg, 1918 – Trinidad

References

Salticidae genera
Salticidae
Spiders of South America